Margaret Cecil, Countess of Salisbury, formerly Lady Margaret Manners (d. c.1682), was the wife of James Cecil, 3rd Earl of Salisbury.

Margaret was a daughter of John Manners, 8th Earl of Rutland, and his wife formerly the Hon Frances Montagu.  Three of Margaret's sisters, Frances, Elizabeth and Dorothy, became countesses.  Another, Anne, became a Viscountess.

She married the future earl on 1 October 1661, seven years before he inherited his grandfather's earldom. 

Their children, several of whom died in infancy, were:

James Cecil, 4th Earl of Salisbury (1666-1694)
Hon Robert Cecil (c.1670-1716), MP, who married Elizabeth Hale, widow of Richard Hale, and had children
Hon William Cecil
Hon Charles Cecil
Hon George Cecil
Lady Catharine Cecil (died 1688), who married Sir George Downing, 2nd Baronet, and had children
Lady Frances Cecil (died 1698), who married Sir William Halford, 1st Baronet, of Welham, and had children
Lady Mary Cecil (d. 29 Mar 1739/40), who married Sir William Forester and had children
Lady Margaret Cecil (1672-1728), who married twice: her first husband was John Stawel, 2nd Baron Stawel of Somerton; her second was Richard Jones, 1st Earl of Ranelagh
Lady Mildred Cecil (died 1727), who married twice: her first husband was Sir Uvedale Corbet, 3rd Baronet, of Leighton; her second was Sir Charles Hotham, 4th Baronet. She had children by both husbands.

References

1682 deaths
English countesses
17th-century English women
Margaret
Margaret
Daughters of British earls